Pei Shuai (born 14 January 1993) is a Chinese professional footballer who currently plays for Chinese Super League club Shenzhen F.C.

Club career
Pei joined Changchun Yatai at the age of 14 in 2007. He was promoted to Changchun Yatai's first team squad by head coach Shen Xiangfu in 2011. His impressive performance in the reserve team league earned him a chance to play for the first team. Pei made his senior debut for Yatai on 11 May 2011, in a Chinese FA Cup second round fixture against Tianjin Runyulong, which Yatai won 4-0, and Pei assisted the third goal for Wang Dong in the match. He made his Chinese Super League debut as a substitute in a 1–0 away defeat against Jiangsu Sainty 4 days later. On 18 September 2011, he scored his first senior goal for Changchun in a 2–1 home victory over Guangzhou Evergrande. He scored the winning goal of the match in 84th minute, which ended Guangzhou's 44-league-match unbeaten run.

On 1 July 2017, Pei transferred to fellow Super League side Tianjin Quanjian. He made his debut for the club one day later in a 4–3 home win against Guangzhou Evergrande, coming on as a substitute for Wang Yongpo in the 89th minute. On 24 April 2018, he scored his first goal for the club in a 3–0 away win over Dalian Boyoung in the 2018 Chinese FA Cup.

On 24 February 2020, Pei joined Chinese Super League club Shenzhen F.C. He made his debut for Shenzhen on 26 July 2020, in the opening league game of the delayed 2020 season, a 3-0 win over Guangzhou R&F.

International career
On 14 January 2017, Pei made his debut for China national team in the third-place playoff of 2017 China Cup against Croatia.

Career statistics 
Statistics accurate as of match played 17 November 2022.

References

External links

1993 births
Living people
Footballers from Shenyang
Chinese footballers
Changchun Yatai F.C. players
Tianjin Tianhai F.C. players
Shenzhen F.C. players
Chinese Super League players
China international footballers
Association football midfielders